Aard el Borj is a mountain of southern Lebanon. It has an elevation of 671 metres.

References

Mountains of Lebanon